Till We Have Faces is Over the Rhine's debut album, released independently in 1991, and re-released in 1995 on I.R.S. Records.

The re-release substitutes two live recordings for the original studio versions, and adds a bonus track, "Downfall".

Track listing

Scampering Songs release (1991)
Eyes Wide Open
Someday
Like a Radio
Iron Curtain
Cast Me Away
And Can It Be
Gentle Wounds
L.A.R. Reprise
If I'm Drowning
Sea and Sky
Fly Dance
Paul and Virginia
Ubiquitous Hands
The Genius of Water

I.R.S. release (1995)
Eyes Wide Open (5:05)
Someday (4:34)
Like a Radio (5:04)
Iron Curtain (2:48)
Cast Me Away (0:45)
And Can It Be (5:46)
Gentle Wounds (4:08)
L.A.R. Reprise (1:05)
If I'm Drowning (4:59)
Sea & Sky (3:21)
Fly Dance (live) (6:22)
Paul and Virginia (4:06)
Ubiquitous Hands (4:10)
The Genius of Water (4:13)
Radio Coda (live) (5:59)
Downfall (2:45)
(Untitled hidden track) (2:34)

Personnel
Karin Bergquist - vocals and acoustic guitar
Ric Hordinski - electric and acoustic guitars, mandolin
Brian Kelley - drums and percussion
Linford Detweiler - bass and keyboards

References

Over the Rhine (band) albums
Music based on novels